Kimberley Chambers is a marathon open water swimmer from New Zealand. She is the sixth person in the world to complete the Ocean's Seven swimming challenge. In 2015, she became the first woman to swim from the Farallon Islands to the Golden Gate Bridge – a distance of about 30 miles.

Life 
Chambers was born in New Zealand and grew up on a sheep farm near Te Kuiti in the King Country in the North Island. She moved to San Francisco when she was 17 years old to study for a master's degree in science at the University of California, Berkeley.

In 2007, Chambers suffered a fall while walking down stairs and almost had her leg amputated; she was diagnosed with acute compartment syndrome and warned it was likely she would never be able to walk unaided. She spent two years in physical therapy and took up swimming to develop her strength, followed by ocean swimming as a challenge. She joined two open water swimming clubs in San Francisco: Dolphin Club and South End Rowing Club. She began swimming all over the world, including in New Zealand, where she swam the Cook Strait between the North and South Islands. Within a year she had completed three of the Ocean's Seven challenge swims and went on to complete all seven.   

In August 2015, Chambers became the first woman to swim from the Farallon Islands to the Golden Gate Bridge – a distance of about 30 miles.  
The same year Chambers was nominated for a Halberg Award in her native New Zealand. In 2017 a documentary film, Kim Swims, was released by independent filmmaker Kate Webber; the film follows Chambers' 2015 Farallon Islands swim. 

Chambers supports the efforts of the local pollution watchdog San Francisco Baykeeper, and serves on the organization's Leadership Circle in order to raise awareness about their mission for Bay protection. Many of her swims are also fundraisers for charities, such as the Semper Fi Fund and the Colibri Centre for Human Rights.

Chambers is a member of the Explorers Club and she was the first New Zealand woman to be inducted into the International Marathon Swimming Hall of Fame.

Recognition 
In 2015 she was nominated for the Halberg Awards’ High Performance Sport New Zealand Sportswoman of the Year. At the WOWSA Awards she has won 2013 and 2014 World Open Water Swimming Woman of the Year and was nominated for 2015 World Open Water Swimming Performance of the Year.

Swims

References

English Channel swimmers
Cook Strait swimmers
Living people
Sportspeople from Te Kūiti
University of California, Berkeley alumni
Year of birth missing (living people)